Hrafnhildur Hauksdóttir (born 4 September 1996) is an Icelandic footballer who plays as a defender for FH and the Iceland national team.

Career
Hrafnhildur played youth football for KFR. She played her first senior team match with ÍBV in the Icelandic League Cup in 2012. She transferred to Selfoss in 2013. She was named the Athlete of the Year for Rangárþing eystra in 2014 and again in 2016. In December 2016, she transferred to Valur.

Hrafnhildur returned to Selfoss in May 2018.

In October 2019, Hrafnhildur signed with FH.

National team career
Hrafnhildur debuted with the Iceland national team in 2016.

References

External links

1996 births
Living people
Women's association football defenders
Hrafnhildur Hauksdóttir
Hrafnhildur Hauksdóttir
FH women's football players
Selfoss women's football players
Valur (women's football) players
ÍBV women's football players
Úrvalsdeild kvenna (football) players